Éramos Seis (The Six of Us) is a Brazilian telenovela produced by Sistema Brasileiro de Televisão (SBT) in 1994, based on the homonym novel by Maria José Dupré. The television series was written by Sílvio de Abreu and Rubens Ewald Filho and directed by Nilton Travesso, Henrique Martins, and Del Rangel. It was aired from 9 May 1994 through 5 December 1994, in 180 episodes.

It was the fourth adaptation of Dupré's novel to TV: Rede Record made the first version in 1958 and Rede Tupi adapted it twice in 1967 and 1977.

Plot
Éramos Seis chronicles the struggles of a middle-class family in São Paulo through the eyes of its matriarch, Dona Lola.

Cast
Irene Ravache ....  Lola 
Othon Bastos .... Júlio 
Tarcísio Filho .... Alfredo
Jandir Ferrari .... Carlos
Luciana Braga .... Maria Isabel 
Leonardo Bricio .... Julinho 
Nathália Timberg .... Aunt Emília 
Jussara Freire .... Clotilde 
Denise Fraga .... Olga
Osmar Prado .... Zeca 
Paulo Figueiredo .... Almeida 
Marco Ricca .... Felício 
Bete Coelho .... Adelaide 
Mayara Magri .... Justina  
Jandira Martini .... Dona Genu 
Marcos Caruso .... Virgulino 
João Vitti .... Lúcio 
Flávia Monteiro .... Lili 
Yara Lins .... Dona Maria 
Wilma de Aguiar .... Tia Candoca 
Eliete Cigarini .... Carmencita 
Antônio Petrin .... Assad 
Angelina Muniz .... Karine 
Luciene Adami .... Maria Laura 
Umberto Magnani .... Alonso 
Nina de Pádua .... Pepa 
Ana Paula Arósio .... Amanda
Carla Diaz .... Eliana
Caio Blat .... Carlos (young)

Awards
São Paulo Association of Art Critics Awards
The Associação Paulista dos Críticos de Artes (APCA) honors the best in the fields of stage acting (since 1956), music, literature, film, television, plastic arts (since 1972/1973), and radio (since 1980).
 1994 – Television: Best Drama
 1994 – Television: Best Actress – Irene Ravache 
 1994 – Television: Best Supporting Actor – Tarcísio Filho

Troféu Imprensa
 1994 – Best Drama
 1994 – Best Actress – Irene Ravache

References

External links

1994 telenovelas
Brazilian telenovelas
Sistema Brasileiro de Televisão telenovelas
1994 Brazilian television series debuts
1994 Brazilian television series endings
Portuguese-language telenovelas